Ga-Mabotha (formerly called Schoongezicht) is a large village in Ga-Matlala in the Blouberg Local Municipality of the Capricorn District Municipality in the Limpopo province of South Africa. It located about 12 km southwest of the town of Senwabarwana.

Education
 Schoongezicht Secondary School.

References

Populated places in the Blouberg Local Municipality